Earinus is a genus of parasitoid wasps belonging to the family Braconidae.

The species of this genus are found in Europe and America.

Species:
 Earinus aurantius Achterberg & Long, 2010
 Earinus bicolor Chou & Sharkey, 1989

References

Braconidae
Braconidae genera